Stefan Pejic (born 5 June 1988) is a Welsh actor born in Swansea, Wales.

Career 
As a child he attended the Mark Jermin Stage School and appeared in many children's television shows for CITV such as Jungle Run and Mad for it, adverts for WHSmith (1998), McDonald's (1999), Kelloggs Crispix (2000) and Krazy Kids, Nickelodeon (2001) and television productions such as The Gormenghast Trilogy, Goodbye Mr Chips, Teachers , Kids Say The Funniest Things  and 2 for 2000.

Pejic appeared in the film About a Boy and as the male lead 'Alfie' in the musical Swansea Women.

Stefan appeared in the 2016–17 pantomime Aladdin at Wolverhampton Grand Theatre between 10 December 2016 and 22 January 2017. He starred alongside Joe McElderry, Lisa Riley, Ian Adams, Lucy Kay, Ben Faulks and Doreen Tipton.

References

External links 
 
 

Living people
1988 births
Welsh male television actors
Butlins Redcoats